Fighter(s) or The Fighter(s) may refer to:

Combat and warfare
 Combatant, an individual legally entitled to engage in hostilities during an international armed conflict
 Fighter aircraft, a warplane designed to destroy or damage enemy warplanes in air-to-air combat
 Fighter pilot, a military aviator who controls a fighter aircraft
 Martial artist, one who practices martial arts
 Soldier, one who fights as part of a military
 Warrior, a person specializing in combat or warfare

Film and television
 The Fighter (1921 film), an American silent film directed by Henry Kolker
 The Fighters (1939 film), a Soviet drama film directed by Eduard Pentslin
 The Fighter (1952 film), an American film noir boxing film directed by Herbert Kline
 The Fighters (1974 film), a documentary film directed by Rick Baxter and William Greaves
 The Fighter (1983 film), a television movie starring Gregory Harrison and Glynnis O'Connor
 Fighter (2000 film), an American documentary about two holocaust survivors
 Fighter (2007 film) or Fightgirl Ayse, a Danish film directed by Natasha Arthy
 The Fighter, a 2010 American biographical sports film directed by David O. Russell
 Fighter (2012 film), an Indian Bengali-language film directed by Rabi Kinagi
 War (2019 film), an Indian film with the working title Fighters
 Fighter, an upcoming 2024 Indian film directed by Siddharth Anand
 "The Fighters", an episode of Bonanza

Games and sports
 Fighter (character class), a common archetypal character class in numerous role-playing games
 Fighter (Dungeons & Dragons), a class in Dungeons & Dragons
 Fighter kite, a type of kite used for the sport of kite fighting
 Hokkaido Nippon-Ham Fighters, a Japanese professional baseball team

Literature
 Fighter: The True Story of the Battle of Britain, a 1977 book by Len Deighton
 The Fighter, a 2008 novel by Craig Davidson

Music
 The Fighters (band), a 1990s American punk rock band
 Fighters, nickname for fans of Christina Aguilera

Albums
 Fighter (David Nail album) or the title song, 2016
 Fighter (Manafest album) or the title song, 2012
 The Fighters (Chad Brownlee album) or the title song, 2014
 The Fighters (LoCash album) or the title song, 2016

Songs
 "Fighter" (Christina Aguilera song), 2003
 "Fighter" (Namie Amuro song), 2016
 "Fighters" (song), by Sandaime J Soul Brothers from Exile Tribe, 2011
 "The Fighter" (Gym Class Heroes song), 2011
 "The Fighter" (Keith Urban song), 2017
 "Fighter", by Bump of Chicken from Butterflies, 2016
 "Fighter", by Monsta X from The Clan Pt. 2 Guilty, 2016
 "Fighter", by Sneaker Pimps, 2021
 "Fighers", by Kris Allen from Thank You Camellia, 2012
 "The Fighter", by In This Moment from Black Widow, 2014
 "The Fighter", by the Fray from Scars & Stories, 2012
 "The Fighter", by Paradise Fears, 2012

Other uses
 Fighter brand, a lower-priced offering intended to under-price competitors

See also
 Bagaudae, groups of peasant insurgents in the Roman Empire whose name means "fighters" in Gaulish
 Fight (disambiguation)
 Senshi (disambiguation), Japanese for "soldier", "combatant", or "warrior"